Westgate Tango is a 2012 Taiwanese romance drama film starring Dylan Kuo, Amber An, Hong Kong actor Anthony Wong, Denny Tsao, Jett Lee and Japanese director actor Toyoharu Kitamura. Directed and written by notable film critic Wei Wang. This is the feature directorial debut by Wang Wei. The film is set in Taipei's trendy Ximending district, best known for its mix of alternative lifestyles, youth fashion and the antimony of adolescent life, and provides an upbeat story of damaged young people finding their purpose in life. The films upbeat tone may appeal to some, but the complexity of the background is obliterated by stereotypes.

Plot
Heartbroken Jin (Dylan Kuo) believes he will never fall in love again. Ending up in Ximending (the cultural-fashion hub of Taipei) after wandering for 12 years, Jin meets the happy go lucky Moé (Amber An), who resuscitates his heart. At the same time, Jin becomes an apprentice to a fortuneteller named Oracle (Anthony Wong), who is the nexus of a list of quirky characters who reside in Ximending. They include Mommy (Denny Tsao), the self-proclaimed 'Queen' of the district. Ace (Jett Lee), a young punk about town who dreams of becoming an idol singer. Aniki (Toyoharu Kitamura), a tattoo artist and a self-proclaimed Japanese gangster. Seemingly mismatched, these eclectic individual's paths intertwine, inexplicably affecting one another and in turn, the pulse of today's Taipei.

Cast
Dylan Kuo 郭品超 sa Jin 景淳
Amber An 安心亞 as Moé 小萌
Anthony Wong 黃秋生 as Oracle 黃秋生
Denny Tsao 曹西平 as Mommy 雄媽
Jett Lee 李杰宇 as Ace 阿華
Toyoharu Kitamura 北村豐晴 as Aniki 阿尼基

References

External links 
 imdb page
official blog
official facebook page

2012 films
2010s Mandarin-language films
Taiwanese drama films
Chinese-language films
2012 romantic drama films
2012 directorial debut films
Universal Pictures films